Gyöngyöspata is a town in Heves County, Hungary. It has the title of town since 15 July 2013.

References

External links

  in Hungarian

Populated places in Heves County